Guyton is a town in the US state of Georgia.

Guyton is also a surname. Notable people with this surname include:

A. J. Guyton (born 1978), American basketball player
Arthur Guyton (1919–2003), American physiologist
Billy Guyton (born 1990), New Zealand rugby union player
Boone Guyton (1913–1996), American test pilot and aviation executive
Carlton Guyton (born 1990), American basketball player
Emma Jane Guyton (1825–1887), English novelist and editor
Gary Guyton (born 1985), American football linebacker
Jalen Guyton (born 1997), American football wide receiver
Joseph William Guyton (1889–1918), first American soldier killed on German-held soil in World War I
Louis-Bernard Guyton de Morveau (1737–1816), French chemist and politician
Mickey Guyton (born 1983), American country music singer
Michele Guyton (born 1966), American politician
Myron Guyton (born 1967), American football defensive back
Scott Guyton (born 1976), New Zealand cyclist and sports director
Trevor Guyton (born 1990), American football defensive tackle
Tyree Guyton (born 1955), American artist
Wade Guyton (born 1972), American artist
Wanda Guyton (born 1965), American basketball coach and player
William Guyton (1816–1884), New Zealand politician

See also